Radical 119 or radical rice meaning "rice" is one of the 29 Kangxi radicals (214 radicals in total) composed of 6 strokes.

In the Kangxi Dictionary, there are 318 characters (out of 49,030) to be found under this radical.

 is also the 144th indexing component in the Table of Indexing Chinese Character Components predominantly adopted by Simplified Chinese dictionaries published in mainland China.

Evolution

Derived characters

Variant forms
This radical character has a different form in Taiwan Traditional Chinese to in other writing systems.

Traditionally, the two diagonal strokes under the horizontal start from the central junction, and the last stroke is a right-falling press when the character appears independently or a dot when used as a component. In Taiwan's Standard Form of National Characters, however, all four diagonal strokes are detached from other strokes, and the last stroke is a dot, whether used independently or as a component.

Literature

External links

Unihan Database - U+7C73

119
144